Benjamin Mark Cork (born 4 August 1993), known professionally as Benedict Cork is an English singer-songwriter. He was raised in Bishop's Stortford, Hertfordshire.

Early life
Benedict was born Benjamin Mark Cork to Andrew Cork and Julia (née Kornberg). His maternal grandfather Sir Hans Kornberg, was a German-born British-American biochemist, whose parents were killed in the Holocaust. Benedict has two older brothers and one older sister, SuRie who represented the United Kingdom in the Eurovision Song Contest 2018 in Lisbon, Portugal.

Growing up in Hertfordshire, Benedict was educated at The Bishop's Stortford High School and Hills Road Sixth Form College. He first started performing in bands with friends before moving to London and taking up work as a piano man in bars.

Career

2018 
Benedict's official recording career started with a collaboration with Simon Jefferis. Their single Easy was released on 9 March 2018. 
 
His first solo release was Piano Tapes in September 2018, a live five-track EP recorded at Red Gate Recorders in Eagle Rock, California. Elton John, on hearing the EP, referred to Benedict as "sensational" and "a name to look out for".  The single Mama Said was described as "devastatingly beautiful" by Billboard.

2019-2020 
After launching a residency at London's Fiction Studios in 2019, Benedict supported Emily King and Tom Walker and appeared at British Summer Time in Hyde Park supporting Stevie Wonder and Lionel Richie. This was followed by Benedict's second EP, Letters To Strangers, in the summer of 2019.
 
Benedict supported Duncan Laurence on his European Tour before recording Piano Tapes Volume II in late 2019/early 2020 and releasing the EP track by track over the summer of 2020. Benedict also appeared in a campaign for French fashion house Mugler alongside English National Ballet dancer Precious Adams performing his song Wildfire.

2021 
On 18 June 2021 Benedict released his EP Secrets I’ll Never Tell which contained five new songs.  BBC 3 Counties Radio aired live versions of some tracks on the evening of 17 June, as well as a discussion around the themes of the EP. These include Benedict's journey growing up as a gay man, heartbreak, sexual identity and the difficulties of being a musician and public figure in a largely digital world.

To coincide with the release of Secrets I’ll Never Tell, Benedict released a series of podcasts by the same name. These showcased frank and open conversations with several collaborators from the world of entertainment and literature including Adam Lambert, MNEK, Sophia Thakur, Duncan Laurence and Precious Adams. The guests came from various ethnic and social backgrounds, and discussed the themes from the EP as well as topics such as mental health, authenticity, gender and the encompassed specific challenges arising from the COVID-19 pandemic and subsequent lockdowns.

2022 
Benedict released his fifth EP If These Walls Could Talk on 22 April 2022. During the If These Walls Could Talk live shows in London and Utrecht, Benedict announced he would be taking time off to write and record his debut album in 2022.

On 21 October 2022, Benedict hosted an album preview show at London’s Collins Music Hall to preview tracks from his debut album. This included the debut single Dream Of You released on V2 Records on 18 November 2022 to coincide with his Incase It Don’t Come True European Tour.

PPLUK Momentum Fund Artist 
On 26th July 2021, Benedict announced that he had been named as a PPLUK Momentum Fund Artist by the PRS Foundation.

Discography

Extended plays

Singles

Songwriting credits
Auryn - "Right Thing To Do" on Ghost Town
Mark Feehily - "Love Me, Or Leave Me Alone" on Fire
Adam Lambert - "Feel Something" on Velvet
Ørjan Nilsen - "Hold me"

Performance credits
ORKID - "Hands" on I Don't Give A Damn (piano)
Angel Haze - "April's Fool" on Dirty Gold (vocals)
Adam Lambert - "Feel Something" on Velvet (piano/backing vocals)
Ørjan Nilsen - "Hold me" (vocals)

References

External links

1993 births
Living people
English people of German-Jewish descent
English pop singers
English pop pianists
People from Harlow
People from Bishop's Stortford
21st-century English singers
21st-century British male singers